Agrostis mertensii is a species of grass belonging to the family Poaceae.

It has almost cosmopolitan distribution.

References

mertensii